900 Broadway, also known as the Goelet Building, is a historical structure commissioned by members of the Goelet family located at the corner of Broadway and East 20th Street, in the Ladies' Mile Historic District of Manhattan, New York City. It was designed by Stanford White of McKim, Mead & White, and built in 1886–1887. The building was enlarged in 1905–06 by Maynicke & Franke.

References 

Beaux-Arts architecture in New York City
McKim, Mead & White buildings
Office buildings completed in 1906
Office buildings in Manhattan
Goelet family
Broadway (Manhattan)
1887 establishments in New York (state)